Borlase Warren (1677 – 15 May 1747) was a British Member of Parliament.

He was the eldest son of Arthur Warren of Stapleford, Nottinghamshire and his wife Anne Borlase, heiress of Sir John Borlase, Bt after her brother John's death in 1689. Warren succeeded his father in 1697. On the death of his mother in 1703 he inherited the Stratton Audley estate.

He was appointed High Sheriff of Nottinghamshire for 1703–04 and for Oxfordshire for 1707–08. He was elected MP for Nottingham in 1713, sitting until 1715, and again from 1727 to 1747, having been defeated in the intervening elections.

He married Anne, the daughter of Sir John Harpur, Bt, with whom he had 7 sons and 7 daughters. His grandson Admiral Sir John Borlase Warren, 1st Baronet also served as MP for Nottingham.

References

1677 births
1747 deaths
People from Stapleford, Nottinghamshire
High Sheriffs of Nottinghamshire
High Sheriffs of Oxfordshire
Members of the Parliament of Great Britain for English constituencies
British MPs 1713–1715
British MPs 1727–1734
British MPs 1734–1741
British MPs 1741–1747